Mill of Mains is a residential area located in the north of Dundee, Scotland.

Overview

History 
The area of Mill of Mains began construction in the 1960s to accommodate Dundee's expanding population, similar to other areas in the north of Dundee. Tower blocks were built in the area alongside social housing. The local primary school, Mill of Mains Primary School opened in 1972 which also serves the areas of Claverhouse and Trottick.

During the 1990s and 2000s, the area of Mill of Mains started to become derelict and became a target of crime. A redevelopment of Mill of Mains began in the early 2010s with the block of flats being demolished and new housing being built. The work carried out by Home Group and the redevelopment of the area is ongoing.

Mill of Mains' local community pavilion which served the area alongside Claverhouse, was burnt down in 2017 and a campaign was launched to rebuild it. In 2021, the community pavilion was rebuilt next to the primary school.

Governance 
Mill of Mains is in the North East ward of Dundee City Council, it is represented by Steven Rome and Willie Sawers of the Scottish National Party and Jax Finnegan of the Scottish Labour Party. The area is part of Dundee City West which is represented by Joe FitzPatrick in the Scottish Parliament, and in Dundee East which is represented by Stewart Hosie in the UK Parliament, both of which are Scottish National Party members.

References 

Areas of Dundee